is a Japanese musician, best known as bassist of The Blue Hearts. He is a music producer in Tokyo, and in 2009 became the deputy director of propaganda for the Happiness Realization Party. He was born Hiroyuki Kawaguchi (河口 宏之 Kawaguchi Hiroyuki) in the Setagaya ward of Tokyo.

History
Kawaguchi had intended on being The Blue Hearts' manager, but when the original bassist left the group in August 1985, he stepped in to help, eventually becoming a band member.

References

The Blue Hearts members
Japanese rock bass guitarists
Punk rock bass guitarists
Japanese punk rock musicians
Musicians from Setagaya
1961 births
Living people